Kyle S. Benjamin (born November 3, 1997) is an American professional stock car racing driver. He most recently competed part-time in the NASCAR Whelen Modified Tour, driving the No. 15 for LFR Chassis, and part-time in the NASCAR Gander Outdoors Truck Series, driving the No. 44 and 45 Chevrolet Silverados for Niece Motorsports. Benjamin has also competed part-time in the NASCAR Xfinity Series for Joe Gibbs Racing. He is a member of the 2015 NASCAR Next class and has formerly competed in the K&N Pro Series East with Ranier Racing with MDM. Benjamin became the youngest winner in the ARCA Racing Series in 2013 at 15 years, 9 months, and 22 days, and held the record until Todd Gilliland broke it in 2015, when his first ARCA win came at 15 years and 2 days.

Racing career

Early years
Starting to race competitively when he was six years old, Benjamin became the youngest winner of the Bandolero nationals, winning the event when he was ten years old. Three years later, he moved into late model racing, in both the Pro and Stock divisions. At the age of fifteen, Benjamin captured the World Series of Asphalt title at New Smyrna Speedway, and won at various other notable tracks around the country such as Winchester Speedway and Lucas Oil Raceway.

ARCA Racing Series
Running a partial schedule for Venturini Motorsports in 2013, Benjamin won the pole at Toledo Speedway to become the series youngest pole winner and won in only his sixth start at Madison International Speedway to become the series' youngest winner at the time. He won two starts later as well. Running a limited schedule for Roulo Brothers Racing in 2014, Benjamin switched to his own team in mid-2014 due to underwhelming performance. After reuniting with Venturini for a race in 2015, Benjamin ran a limited schedule in 2016 as part of his affiliation with Ranier Racing with MDM.

K&N Pro Series East
Running a race for Ken Schrader Racing in 2013, then three for his own team in 2014, Benjamin caught his break in 2015, winning his first race (at Bristol Motor Speedway), being named to the NASCAR Next class, and finishing ninth in points. Signing on with Ranier Racing with MDM before the 2016 season, Benjamin won five poles, three races and finished runner-up to Justin Haley by only twenty-two points.

Gander Outdoors Truck Series
On March 19, 2018, it was announced that Benjamin would make his Truck Series debut driving the No. 54 Tundra for DGR-Crosley at Martinsville Speedway. He led over a quarter of the race but finished second to John Hunter Nemechek in a close finish. Benjamin returned to the organization, this time driving the No. 17, for the fall Martinsville race, starting and finishing fifth in a truck that Benjamin believed could have finished second.

In 2019, Benjamin returned to the Truck Series on a seven-race schedule in the No. 45 Chevrolet Silverado for Niece Motorsports.

Xfinity Series
On April 5, 2017, it was announced that Benjamin would run five races for Joe Gibbs Racing in the 2017 NASCAR Xfinity Series: three in the No. 18 (2 at Iowa Speedway and Kentucky Speedway) and two in the No. 20 (his debut at Richmond International Raceway and a race at Pocono Raceway). He won his first pole at Pocono, and went on to lead 28 laps, the second-most of anybody else behind eventual winner Brad Keselowski. At Iowa, Benjamin led five laps, but lost out to JGR teammate Ryan Preece and finished second. He returned to the team in 2018, announcing a two-race slate in February. After an eighth-place run at Atlanta Motor Speedway, a run for the win on the final restart at Iowa was derailed after John Hunter Nemechek made contact with Benjamin.

Whelen Modified Tour
On February 1, 2019, it was announced that Benjamin will contest a part of the 2019 NASCAR Whelen Modified Tour schedule for LFR Chassis in the No. 15 car. The schedule was later revealed to be eight races, and Benjamin stated in April that there may be an opportunity in the NASCAR Gander Outdoors Truck Series later on.

Personal life
Benjamin was homeschooled during his high school years.

Motorsports career results

NASCAR
(key) (Bold – Pole position awarded by qualifying time. Italics – Pole position earned by points standings or practice time. * – Most laps led. ** – All laps led.)

Xfinity Series

Gander Outdoors Truck Series

K&N Pro Series East

K&N Pro Series West

 Season still in progress
 Ineligible for series points

ARCA Racing Series

References

External links
 
 

NASCAR drivers
People from Easley, South Carolina
Racing drivers from South Carolina
1997 births
ARCA Menards Series drivers
ARCA Midwest Tour drivers
Living people
Joe Gibbs Racing drivers